Heinrich Weber (21 June 1900 – 22 January 1977) was a German international footballer.

International career 
Weber won 12 caps for the Germany national team in the interwar period. His first two matches for the team took place at the Summer Olympics in 1928.

References

External links
 
 
 
 

1900 births
1977 deaths
Association football defenders
German footballers
Germany international footballers
Olympic footballers of Germany
Footballers at the 1928 Summer Olympics